The sixth season of The Bachelor premiered on 15 August 2018. This season features Nick Cummins, a 30-year-old former professional rugby player from Sydney, courting 28 women.

Contestants
The season began with 25 contestants. In episode 7, three "intruders" were brought into the competition, bringing the total number of contestants to 28.

Call-out order

 The contestant received the key to Nick's bachelor pad.
 The contestant received a rose during a date.
 The contestant received a rose outside of a date or the rose ceremony.
 The contestant was eliminated.
 The contestant was eliminated during a date.
 The contestant quit the competition.
 The contestant was eliminated outside the rose ceremony.
 The contestant won the competition.

Episodes

Episode 1
Original airdate: 15 August 2018

Episode 2
Original airdate: 16 August 2018

Episode 3
Original airdate: 22 August 2018

Episode 4
Original airdate: 23 August 2018

Episode 5
Original airdate: 29 August 2018

Episode 6
Original airdate: 30 August 2018

Episode 7
Original airdate: 5 September 2018

Episode 8
Original airdate: 6 September 2018

Episode 9
Original airdate: 12 September 2018

Episode 10
Original airdate: 13 September 2018

Episode 11
Original airdate: 19 September 2018

Episode 12
Original airdate: 20 September 2018

Episode 13
Original airdate: 26 September 2018

Episode 14
Original airdate: 27 September 2018

Episode 15
Original airdate: 3 October 2018

Episode 16
Original airdate: 4 October 2018

Ratings

References

2018 Australian television seasons
Australian (season 06)
Television shows filmed in Australia
Television shows filmed in New Caledonia